This is a comprehensive list of victories of the  cycling team. The races are categorized according to the UCI Continental Circuits rules. The team was a Continental  team in 2008 a  Professional Continental team from 2011 to 2020. In 2021 the team stepped up to the world tour.

Sources:

2008 
No recorded wins

2009 
 Circuit de Wallonie, Romain Zingle

2010 

Arno Wallaard Memorial, Stefan van Dijk
Omloop der Kempen, Stefan van Dijk
Stage 3 Rhône-Alpes Isère Tour, Andy Cappelle
Flèche Ardennaise, Thomas Degand
Stage 2 Tour de Wallonie, Stefan van Dijk
Polynormande, Andy Cappelle
Grote Prijs Stad Zottegem, Stefan van Dijk
Omloop van het Houtland, Stefan van Dijk

2011 

Beverbeek Classic, Evert Verbist
Stage 2 Delta Tour Zeeland, Steven Caethoven
Stage 1 Route du Sud, Stefan van Dijk
Stage 3 Route du Sud, Jurgen Van Goolen
Dwars door het Hageland, Grégory Habeaux

2012 
Grote Prijs Jef Scherens, Steven Caethoven

2013 
Stage 1 Driedaagse van West-Vlaanderen, Danilo Napolitano

2014 

Stage 2 La Tropicale Amissa Bongo, Jérôme Baugnies
Stage 3 La Tropicale Amissa Bongo, Roy Jans
Stages 6 & 7 La Tropicale Amissa Bongo, Fréderique Robert
Omloop van het Waasland, Danilo Napolitano
Stage 1 Tour des Fjords, Jérôme Baugnies
La Poly Normande, Jan Ghyselinck
Stage 1 Tour du Limousin, Björn Leukemans
Stage 1 Tour du Gévaudan Languedoc-Roussillon, Thomas Degand
Gooikse Pijl, Roy Jans

2015 

Stage 2 Étoile de Bessèges, Roy Jans
Tour du Finistère, Tim De Troyer
Stage 3 Boucles de la Mayenne, Danilo Napolitano
Ronde van Limburg, Björn Leukemans
Grote Prijs Jef Scherens, Björn Leukemans
Druivenkoers Overijse, Jérôme Baugnies
Schaal Sels-Merksem, Robin Stenuit

2016 

Amstel Gold Race, Enrico Gasparotto
Stage 4 4 Jours de Dunkerque, Kenny Dehaes
Stage 3 Rhône-Alpes Isère Tour, Jérôme Baugnies
Stage 3 Tour de Picardie, Kenny Dehaes
Ronde van Limburg, Kenny Dehaes
Internationale Wielertrofee Jong Maar Moedig I.W.T., Jérôme Baugnies
Grote Prijs Jef Scherens, Dimitri Claeys
Stage 7 Tour of Austria, Frederik Backaert

2017 

Le Samyn, Guillaume Van Keirsbulck
 Overall Rhône-Alpes Isère Tour, Marco Minnaard
 Overall Tour du Jura, Thomas Degand

2018 

 Overall Circuit Cycliste Sarthe – Pays de la Loire, Guillaume Martin
Stage 3, Guillaume Martin
Grand Prix de Plumelec-Morbihan, Andrea Pasqualon
 Overall Tour de Luxembourg, Andrea Pasqualon
Stages 2 & 3 Tour de Luxembourg, Andrea Pasqualon
Internationale Wielertrofee Jong Maar Moedig I.W.T., Jérôme Baugnies
Stage 3 Tour de Wallonie, Odd Christian Eiking
GP Stad Zottegem, Jérôme Baugnies
Schaal Sels, Timothy Dupont
Druivenkoers Overijse, Xandro Meurisse
Antwerp Port Epic, Guillaume Van Keirsbulck
Overall Tour of Taihu Lake, Boris Vallée

2019 

Stage 4 Giro di Sicilia, Guillaume Martin
Stage 2 Tour of Austria, Tom Devriendt
 Overall Tour de Wallonie, Loïc Vliegen
Stage 1, Timothy Dupont
Stage 2, Loïc Vliegen
Stage 3 Arctic Race of Norway, Odd Christian Eiking
Stage 5 Tour Poitou-Charentes en Nouvelle Aquitaine, Andrea Pasqualon
Antwerp Port Epic, Aimé De Gendt

2020 

 Overall Vuelta a Murcia, Xandro Meurisse
Stage 1, Xandro Meurisse
Tour du Doubs, Loïc Vliegen
Gooikse Pijl, Danny van Poppel

2021 

Stage 3 Giro d'Italia, Taco van der Hoorn
 National Time Trial Championships, Rein Taaramäe
Stage 2 Tour de l'Ain, Georg Zimmermann
Stage 3 Vuelta a España, Rein Taaramäe
Egmont Cycling Race, Danny van Poppel	
Stage 3 Benelux Tour, Taco van der Hoorn
Classic Grand Besançon Doubs, Biniam Girmay	
Omloop van het Houtland, Taco van der Hoorn	
Binche–Chimay–Binche, Danny van Poppel

2022 

 Trofeo Alcúdia – Port d'Alcúdia, Biniam Girmay
 Clásica de Almería, Alexander Kristoff	
  Overall Tour of Oman, Jan Hirt
Stage 5, Jan Hirt
 Gent–Wevelgem, Biniam Girmay
 Scheldeprijs, Alexander Kristoff
 Stage 6 Four Days of Dunkirk, Gerben Thijssen
 Stage 10 Giro d'Italia, Biniam Girmay
 Stage 16 Giro d'Italia, Jan Hirt
 Circuit de Wallonie, Andrea Pasqualon
 Stage 6 Tour of Norway, Alexander Kristoff
 Giro dell'Appennino, Louis Meintjes
 Brussels Cycling Classic, Taco van der Hoorn
 Stage 4 Tour of Belgium, Quinten Hermans
  National Time Trial Championships, Rein Taaramäe
  National Time Trial Championships, Biniam Girmay
 Stage 5 Tour de Wallonie, Jan Bakelants
 Stage 2 Tour de Pologne, Gerben Thijssen
  Overall Sazka Tour, Lorenzo Rota
Stage 2, Lorenzo Rota
 Circuit Franco–Belge, Alexander Kristoff
 Stage 2 Deutschland Tour, Alexander Kristoff
 Stage 9 Vuelta a España, Louis Meintjes
 Gooikse Pijl, Gerben Thijssen

2023 

 Trofeo Calvià, Rui Costa
 Trofeo Andratx–Mirador D'es Colomer, Kobe Goossens
 Trofeo Serra de Tramuntana, Kobe Goossens
  Overall Volta a la Comunitat Valenciana, Rui Costa
Stage 1, Biniam Girmay
Stage 5, Rui Costa
 Grote Prijs Jean-Pierre Monseré, Gerben Thijssen

Supplementary statistics
Sources

Notes

References

Wil
Intermarché–Wanty–Gobert Matériaux